Bob Marshall (born December 7, 1937) is a Republican politician who was a member of the Kansas Senate, representing the 13th district from 2009 until 2013. He was defeated in the 2012 Republican primary by Jacob LaTurner.

He is a retired airplane pilot from Fort Scott.

Committee assignments
Sen. Marshall served on these legislative committees:
 Transportation (vice-chair)
 Assessment and Taxation
 Confirmation Oversight
 Joint Committee on Economic Development
 Education
 Local Government

Major donors
Some of the top contributors to Marshall's 2008 campaign, according to the National Institute on Money in State Politics:
Kansas Republican Senatorial Committee, Crawford County Republican Central Committee, Bob Marshall(self-finance), Kansas Contractors Associations, QC Holdings Inc.

Political parties were his largest donor group.

References

External links
Kansas Senate
Project Vote Smart profile
 Follow the Money campaign contributions
 1999, 2001, 2003, 2005, 2007, 2008

Republican Party Kansas state senators
Living people
People from Fort Scott, Kansas
1937 births
21st-century American politicians